Satyrodes eurydice, the eyed brown or marsh eyed brown, is a species of Satyrinae butterfly that is native to North America.

There are two subspecies—the nominate species, the eyed brown (S. e. eurydice), and the smokey eyed brown (S. e. fumosa) (Leussler, 1916).

Wingspan: 38 to 48 mm.

They have one brood with a flight period from late June through August.

Larvae feed on sedges (Carex) in particular C. lacustris, C. atherodes, C. rostrata, and C. stricta.

Similar species
Satyrodes appalachia (R.L. Chermock, 1947) – Appalachian brown
Enodia anthedon A.H. Clark, 1936 – northern pearly-eye

References and external links

Butterflies of North America
Butterflies described in 1763
Elymniini
Taxa named by Carl Linnaeus